Båsbolken Spur is a rocky spur near the head of Tvibåsen Valley which divides the upper valley into two equal parts, in the Mühlig-Hofmann Mountains of Queen Maud Land. It was mapped from surveys and from air photos by the Sixth Norwegian Antarctic Expedition (1956–60).

References
 

Ridges of Queen Maud Land
Princess Astrid Coast